The 2015 Alabama Crimson Tide softball team is an American softball team, representing the University of Alabama for the 2015 NCAA softball season. The Crimson Tide play their home games at Rhoads Stadium. After losing in the 2014 Women's College World Series, the 2015 team looks to make the postseason for the 17th straight year, and the Women's College World Series for tenth time. This season represents the 19th season of softball in the school's history.

Roster

2015 Alabama Crimson Tide Softball Roster

Schedule 

|-
!colspan=9| Sand Dollar Classic

|-
!colspan=9|

|-
!colspan=9| Stanford Nike Invitational

|-
!colspan=9|

|-
!colspan=9|Easton Bama Bash

|-
!colspan=9|

|-
!colspan=9|Easton Crimson Classic

|-
!colspan=9|

|-
!colspan=9|SEC Tournament

|-
!colspan=9|NCAA Tuscaloosa Regional

|-
!colspan=9|NCAA Tuscaloosa Super Regional

|-
!colspan=9|NCAA Women's College World Series

Honors and awards
 Haylie McCleney was selected Preaseson All-SEC Team.
 Sydney Littlejohn was selected as the SEC Pitcher of the Week on February 9.
 Haylie McCleney was selected as the SEC Player of the Week on February 16.
 Sydney Littlejohn was selected as the SEC Pitcher of the Week on March 9.
 Demi Turner was selected as the SEC Freshman of the Week on March 16.
 Demi Turner was selected as the SEC Freshman of the Week on March 30.
 Leslie Jury was selected as the SEC Pitcher of the Week on April 27.
 Alexis Osorio was selected as the SEC Freshman of the Year.
 Haylie McCleney was selected as the SEC Scholar-Athlete of the Year.
 Haylie McCleney and Alexis Osorio were selected as First Team All-SEC.
 Marisa Runyon and Demi Turner were selected as Second Team All-SEC.

Ranking movement

See also
 2015 Alabama Crimson Tide baseball team

References

Alabama
Alabama Crimson Tide softball seasons
Alabama
Alabama Crimson Tide softball season
Women's College World Series seasons